Fascination is a 1931 British drama film directed by Miles Mander and starring Madeleine Carroll, Carl Harbord and Dorothy Bartlam. It was made by British International Pictures at the company's Elstree Studios near London. The film's sets were designed by the art directors Clarence Elder and David Rawnsley.

It features minor performances from the future stars Freddie Bartholomew and Merle Oberon.

Cast
 Madeleine Carroll as Gwenda Farrell  
 Carl Harbord as Larry Maitland  
 Dorothy Bartlam as Vera Maitland  
 Kay Hammond as Kay  
 Kenneth Kove as Bertie  
 Louis Goodrich as Colonel Farrington  
 Roland Culver as Ronnie  
 Freddie Bartholomew as Child 
 John Kove as Child 
 Merle Oberon as Flower Seller 
 Allison Van Dyke as Child

References

Bibliography
 Low, Rachael. Filmmaking in 1930s Britain. George Allen & Unwin, 1985.
 Wood, Linda. British Films, 1927-1939. British Film Institute, 1986.

External links

1931 films
British drama films
1931 drama films
Films shot at British International Pictures Studios
Films directed by Miles Mander
British black-and-white films
1930s English-language films
1930s British films